The Burnie Gift is a professional footrace held in Burnie, Tasmania during an annual sports carnival, held on a grass track at West Park Oval on New Year's Eve. It is conducted by the Tasmanian Athletic League in conjunction with the Burnie Athletic Club. The Burnie Gift is a sprint event conducted over the traditional 'Gift' distance of 120 metres.

Athletes are allocated handicaps with a range from scratch (running the full 120 metres) to the current limit of 12.00 metres. An athlete off 12.00m would run 108 metres. Most athletes (and winners) run from a handicap between 5.0m and 10.0m, thereby covering anywhere from 115m to 110m. Handicaps are assigned by a panel based on an assessment of each athlete’s track performances.
Athletes are separated by lane ropes as opposed to painted lanes on synthetic tracks. The finish line is a finishing gate that each athlete must run through to record a time. 

The Burnie Carnival is the premier running carnival in Tasmania and is considered one of the 'big three' professional Gifts in Australia along with Victoria's Stawell Gift and the Bay Sheffield in South Australia. Along with the feature event, the Burnie carnival includes races over 90m, 400m and 1600m. The Burnie carnival is one of three Tasmanian Christmas Carnivals conducted over a seven-day period from 26 December to 1 January. The other carnivals are held at Latrobe and Devonport.

History 
First run in 1885, it was initially held as the Sheffield Handicap and was renamed to Burnie Gift for the 1908 event. The carnival was traditionally held on New Year's Day, but switched to New Year's Eve in 2019. Two carnivals were held in 2019. The distance was originally 130 yards, and switched to 120 metres in 1973. The Women's Gift was introduced in 1995, although was known for the first few years as the Women's 120m Handicap.

Dean Capobianco (1991) was the first athlete to win the race off scratch (running the full 120 metres). Joshua Ross (2004 and 2007) is the only man to have won the Gift twice off the scratch mark. Capobianco and Ross are the only national 100m champions to have won the Gift.

In 2018, Hobart sprinter Jack Hale was given an unprecedented handicap of -1 metres, giving him 121 metres to run.

Winners

References

External links
 Tasmanian Athletic League
 "Boring night turns into riper day" The Advocate
 "Alicia finally makes her mark" - The Independent Weekly

Athletics in Tasmania
Sport in Burnie, Tasmania
Running in Australia